The Hank McCune Show is an American television sitcom. Filmed without a studio audience, the series is notable for being the first television program to incorporate a laugh track.

The series began as a local Los Angeles program in 1949. NBC placed it on its national primetime schedule at the start of the 1950–51 season. It debuted at 7:00pm Eastern Time on September 9 and was cancelled three months later. It was briefly resurrected as a syndicated program in 1953–54, but without a laugh track.

Overview
 
The premise foreshadowed that of The Larry Sanders Show in that it contained a show within a show. Former radio comedian McCune portrayed a television variety show host named after himself, and each week the character managed to blunder his way into a variety of comic predicaments.

The supporting cast included Larry Keating, Charles Maxwell, Frank Nelson, and Florence Bates.

See also
1950-51 United States network television schedule

References

External links

1950 American television series debuts
1950 American television series endings
1950s American sitcoms
Black-and-white American television shows
English-language television shows
NBC original programming
Television series about television